Robert Persichetti Jr. (born January 17, 1973) is an American animator, story artist, storyboard artist, screenwriter, and film director. He is best known for co-directing the film Spider-Man: Into the Spider-Verse.

Filmography
Director
 Spider-Man: Into the Spider-Verse (2018) (with Peter Ramsey and Rodney Rothman)

Executive producer
 Spider-Man: Across the Spider-Verse (2023) 
 Spider-Man: Beyond the Spider-Verse (2024)

Producer
 The Tiger's Apprentice (2024)

Writer
 The Little Prince (2015) 

Head of story
 Puss in Boots (2011)
 The Little Prince (2015)

Storyboard artist
 Shrek 2 (2004)  
 Wallace & Gromit: The Curse of the Were-Rabbit (2005)
 Flushed Away (2006)
 Shrek the Halls (2007)   
 Monsters vs. Aliens (2009)

Inbetweener
 Hercules (1997)
 Mulan (1998)
 Tarzan (1999)
 Fantasia 2000 (1999)
 The Emperor's New Groove (2000)
 Atlantis: The Lost Empire (2001)
 Treasure Planet (2002)

Accolades

References

External links

American animated film directors
American people of Italian descent
Animation screenwriters
Annie Award winners
Directors of Best Animated Feature Academy Award winners
Hugo Award winners
Living people
DreamWorks Animation people
Walt Disney Animation Studios people
Aardman Animations people
Sony Pictures Animation people
1973 births